Hayley Barker is an American painter. Exhibition A has described Barker's painting practice as the following: "Barker's main subject is the natural world, which she renders expressively in oil on linen. The intuitive undercurrent in her approach enlivens the real and imagined scenes she paints, allowing viewers to pierce directly through to the space between things."

Biography 
Hayley Barker was born in Oregon. She received her BA from the University of Oregon, and her MA & MFA in Intermedia from the University of Iowa. She has solo exhibitions with Shrine NYC, including a solo booth at the Armory Art Fair. She has had work featured at La Loma Projects (LA), Tiger Strikes Asteroid (Chicago), Big Pictures LA, GAS (LA), " The Glendale Biennial" curated by the Pit at the Brand Library & "The Divine Joke", curated by Barry Schwabsky at Anita Rogers Gallery (New York). She has shown with Bozo Mag for the past several years. She lives and works in Los Angeles, California.

Work 

Of Barker's first solo exhibition in New York with Shrine in 2020 Barry Schwabsky, art critic and historian, writes:

"Barker’s paintings elaborate spaces that can’t be nailed down and identified. She calls them “spaces of passage,” of transition—across the immeasurable distance from life to death, perhaps, but also within life, from one physical or spiritual state to another. Her works speak of mystery, loss: intimations of what lies beyond the boundaries of the self."

Barker has been covered in articles published by Forbes Magazine and the Wall Street Journal. Brienne Walsh covered Barker's 2020 solo exhibition at Shrine, The Grass is Blue. She writes about Barker's  approach to landscape painting: "The landscape painting Barker wants to create relates to femininity, an earth-based spirituality, the idea that humans are not separate from nature, but instead, part of it. “I believe we come from the earth, and the earth is our home and our protector,” Barker says."

In 2011, art critic Sue Taylor reviewed Barker's show "Cathedrals" in "Art in America".  Taylor writes:  Taylor compared Barker's paintings to the work of Georgia O'Keeffe and Vincent van Gogh. Barker's "Cathedrals" is inspired by the childhood diary of Opal Whiteley, who had visionary, spiritual experiences but was later diagnosed as schizophrenic. Taylor writes:

Solo exhibitions

 2023 "Laguna Castle," Night Gallery, Los Angeles
 2022 "Bozo House," BozoMag, Los Angeles
 2022 "The Spider," SHRINE, NYC
 2021 "Incense", The Armory Art Fair with Shrine, NYC
 2020 "The Grass is Blue", SHRINE, NYC
 2020 ALAC, Bozo Mag, LA
 2019 "LATE BLOOMER," Bozo Mag, LA
 2018 "Hayley Barker: Open Studio," Bozo Mag, LA
 2018 "AMPM," Holding Contemporary/Williamson Knight, Portland, OR
 2017 "New Paintings" Bozo Mag/Abode, LA

Group exhibitions 

 2023 "Death of an Outsider," SHRINE, Los Angeles
 2022: "Unnatural Nature: Post-Pop Landscapes," Acquavella Gallery, NYC
 2022: "Shrubs," Night Gallery, Los Angeles
 2021: "The Rock," BozoMag in collaboration with Pocket Studio, Los Angeles
 2021 "36 Paintings," Harper's East Hampton
 2021 "The Language of Flowers," Reyes Finn, Detroit, MI
 2020 "Eartha" Adams and Ollman, Portland, OR
 2020 "Untitled, (But Loved)" Bosse & Baum, London
 2020 NADA: This is fair
 2020 "New Beginnings..." Nicodim, LA
 2020 Connections: Shrine, NYC
 2020 "Conscious Collaboration with Spirit," SOIL Gallery, Seattle
 2019 "Summer Formal," La Loma Projects, LA
 2018 "Take Care," GAS, LA
 2018 "The Divine Joke," Anita Rogers Gallery, NY

References

External links
 Official website
 Hayley Barker Instagram
 Bozo Mag, Los Angeles

Living people
1973 births
University of Oregon alumni
University of Iowa alumni
Artists from Oregon
Artists from Los Angeles
American women painters
American contemporary painters
Feminist artists
20th-century American painters
20th-century American women artists
21st-century American women artists